Zbigniew Marian Podraza (born 2 December 1953 in Sosnowiec) is a Polish politician. He was the mayor of Dąbrowa Górnicza. He was also a member of the Sejm 2001-2005. He was elected to the Sejm on 25 September 2005, getting 5363 votes in 32 Sosnowiec district as a candidate from Democratic Left Alliance list.

See also
Members of Polish Sejm 2005-2007

External links
Zbigniew Marian Podraza - parliamentary page - includes declarations of interest, voting record, and transcripts of speeches. 

1953 births
Living people
People from Sosnowiec
Democratic Left Alliance politicians
Members of the Polish Sejm 2001–2005
Members of the Polish Sejm 2005–2007